Supangle or sup is a type of Turkish chocolate pudding. Its bottom layer includes pieces of cake and it is often garnished with pistachio or coconut, and chocolate chips.

Etymology 
The name supangle comes from soupe anglaise, French for English soup. It can be thought to be the literal translation of the name of the Italian dessert Zuppa Inglese, but Zuppa Inglese is known by its Italian name in France and the name soupe anglaise is not used. Despite the possible etymological link, the dessert supangle bears no resemblance to zuppa Inglese other than the inclusion of cake under a creamy pudding.

Preparation 
Supangle is cooked from milk, sugar, flour, and cocoa powder, with butter and chocolate added. The bottom layer of supangle consists of cake, cookie, or biscuits, for which leftovers may be used. Eggs and hazelnut chocolate spread (e.g. Nutella) are also used in some recipes. It is decorated with ground pistachio or shredded coconut and served cold. Serving it with ice cream is also growing in popularity.

See also

 List of Turkish desserts
 List of puddings

References 

Turkish puddings